is a railway station on the Rikuu East Line in the city of Ōsaki, Miyagi Prefecture, Japan, operated by East Japan Railway Company (JR East).

Lines
Naruko-Onsen Station is served by the Rikuu East Line, and is located 44.9 kilometers from the starting point of the line at Kogota Station.

Station layout
Naruko-Onsen Station has one island platform, connected to the station building by a footbridge. The station has a Midori no Madoguchi staffed ticket office.

Platforms

History
The station was absorbed into the JR East network upon the privatization of JNR on 1 April 1987. It was renamed Naruko-Onsen Station on 22 March 1997.

Passenger statistics
In fiscal 2016, the station was used by an average of 226 passengers daily (boarding passengers only).

Surrounding area
National Route 47
National Route 108
Naruko Onsen
Naruko Pass

See also
 List of Railway Stations in Japan

References

External links

  

Railway stations in Miyagi Prefecture
Rikuu East Line
Railway stations in Japan opened in 1915
Ōsaki, Miyagi
Stations of East Japan Railway Company